Bartman may refer to:

 Bartman, alter ego of Bart Simpson in The Simpsons
 Bartman (comics), comic book of the alter ego character published by Bongo Comics
 The Simpsons: Bartman Meets Radioactive Man, video game for the NES starring the alter ego character.
 "Do the Bartman", song and music video based on the Bart Simpson character
 Steve Bartman incident, Chicago Cubs fan who gained exposure during the 2003 National League Championship Series

See also
 Batman, fictional character
 Sarah Baartman, sometimes spelled Bartman